Forward Operating Base Inkerman or more simply FOB Inkerman is a former Forward Operating Base in Afghanistan operated by the International Security Assistance Force (ISAF) under Operation Herrick (OP H), it was located  north east of Sangin.

Units
 OP H 6 (June – October 2007)
 1st Battalion, Grenadier Guards
 C (Essex) Company, 1st Battalion, Royal Anglian Regiment 
 OP H 7 (October 2007 – April 2008)
 Alpha Company, 40 Commando Royal Marines
 Hislop Troop, 97 Battery (Lawson's Company), 4th Regiment Royal Artillery
 OP H 8 (April 2008 – October 2008)
 B Company, 2nd Battalion, Parachute Regiment
 Temporarily supported by half of B Company, 3rd Battalion, Parachute Regiment during July 2008.
 8 Platoon (Fire Support Group), B Company, 2nd Battalion, The Rifles
 1st and 2nd Troop, A Squadron, Queens Royal Lancers who formed the Viking Armoured Support Group. (May 2008 - September 2008)
 OP H 9 (October 2008 – April 2009)
 Yankee Company, 45 Commando, Royal Marines
 OP H 10 (April 2009 – October 2009)
 2nd Battalion, The Rifles
OP H 11 (October 2009 - April 2010) 
 A Company, 4th Battalion, The Rifles
 OP H 12 (April 2010 - October 2010)
 Bravo Company, 40 Commando, Royal Marines

References

Citations

Bibliography

War in Afghanistan (2001–2021)
Military bases of the United Kingdom in Afghanistan